The Catholic Metropolitan Archdiocese of Mary Most Holy in Astana is a Latin archdiocese of the Roman Catholic Church in Kazakhstan.

Its cathedral episcopal see is the Marian Cathedral of Our Mother of Perpetual Help, in the Kazakh national capital Astana. The founding and only Apostolic administrator Tomasz Peta was appointed the first Archbishop of Mary Most Holy in Astana by John Paul II on May 17, 1999.

History 
Pope John Paul II erected it as the Apostolic Administration of Astana on July 7, 1999, on territory split off from the then Apostolic Administration of Kazakhstan (which lost more territories and became the diocese of Karaganda and soon after, unusually, daughter diocese Astana's suffragan), and visited it in September 2001.

The same pope promoted it to the Archdiocese of Mary Most Holy in Astana on May 17, 2003.

Province 
Its ecclesiastical province comprises the Metropolitan's own archdiocese and the following suffragan jurisdictions : 
 Roman Catholic Diocese of Karaganda (its parent diocese)
 Roman Catholic Diocese of Santissima Trinità in Almaty.
 Apostolic Administration of Atyrau (a pre-diocesan type of jurisdiction which normally remains exempt, i.e. directly dependent on the Holy See)

Ordinaries of Astana 
(all Roman Rite, so far European Latin missionaries)

Apostolic Administrator of Astana 
 Tomasz Peta (7 Jul 1999  – 17 May 2003), Titular Bishop of Benda, Albania (15 Feb 2001  – 17 May 2003)

Metropolitan Archbishops of Astana 
 Tomasz Peta (17 May 2003 – ... ), also President of Episcopal Conference of Kazakhstan (May 2003 – ... )

See also 
 Catholic Church in Kazakhstan

Sources and external links
 GCatholic.org, with incumbent biography links
 Catholic-Hierarchy

Astana
Culture in Astana
Maria Santissima in Astana
Astana
1999 establishments in Kazakhstan